The Denver–North Dakota men's ice hockey rivalry is a college ice hockey rivalry between the Denver Pioneers men's ice hockey and North Dakota Fighting Hawks men's ice hockey programs. The first meeting between the two occurred on February 1, 1950. The two programs have met in the national championship game on four occasions with Denver holding 3–1 edge.

History
North Dakota founded their ice hockey team in the late 1920s. However, due to the Great depression, the program was shuttered for most of the 30s. The then-Fighting Sioux returned in full after World War II and were one of only a handful of teams west of the Appalachians. In 1949, Denver joined in with a team of their own and the two became founding members of the MCHL two years later. With the exception of 1959, the two have remained conference rivals since and are typically regarded as two of the top programs in college ice hockey. As of 2022, Denver is tied with Michigan for the most national championships (9) with North Dakota not far behind (8). Additionally, the two have met in the final game on four separate occasions (1958, 1963, 1968, 2005) which is also tied for the most common championship rematch in NCAA history.

Game results
Full game results for the rivalry, with rankings beginning in the 1998–99 season.

Series facts

References

External links
 Denver Pioneers men's ice hockey
 North Dakota Fighting Hawks men's ice hockey

College ice hockey rivalries in the United States
National Collegiate Hockey Conference
Denver Pioneers ice hockey
North Dakota Fighting Hawks men's ice hockey
1950 establishments in Colorado
1950 establishments in North Dakota